is a Japanese professional shogi player ranked 5-dan.

Early life
Ikenaga was born in Osaka on April 20, 1993. He learned how to play shogi from a book his father bought for him when he was first grade elementary school student.

In September 2006, Ikenaga was accepted into the Japan Shogi Association (JSA) apprentice school at the rank of 6-kyū as a student of shogi professional Kenji Kobayashi. He was promoted to the rank of apprentice professional 3-dan in 2010, and obtained full professional status and the corresponding rank of 4-dan in April 2018 tying for first with  Kōhei Hasebe in the 62nd 3-dan League (October 2017March 2018) with a record of 14 wins and 4 losses.

Shogi professional
In October 2019, Ikenaga defeated apprentice professional 3-dan Shin'ichirō Hattori 2 games to 1 to win the 9th . In October 2020, Ikenaga defeated apprentice professional 3-dan Yūki Saitō 2 games to none to win the 51st  tournament.

Promotion history
Ikenaga's promotion history is as follows:
 6-kyū: September 2006
 3-dan: April 2010
 4-dan: April 1, 2018
 5-dan: April 3, 2021

Titles and other championships
Ikenaga has yet to appear in a major title match, but he has won two non-major title championships.

Awards and honors
Ikenaga won the Japan Shogi Association's Annual Shogi Award for "Best New Player" for the 20202021 shogi year.

References

External links
 ShogiHub: Professional Player Info · Ikenaga, Takashi

1993 births
Living people
People from Osaka
Japanese shogi players
Professional shogi players
Professional shogi players from Osaka Prefecture
Kakogawa Seiryū
Shinjin-Ō